Rajarani Temple is an 11th-century Hindu temple located in Bhubaneswar, the capital city of Odisha (Orissa previously), India.

Overview
The temple is believed to have been known originally as Indreswara. It is locally known as a "love temple" because of the erotic carvings of women and couples in the temple. The temple was constructed of dull red and yellow sandstone locally called "Rajarani". There are no images inside the sanctum, and hence it is not associated with a specific sect of Hinduism but broadly classified as Saivite based on the niches.

History
Based on the sculptural architectural style, the temple is dated to the mid-11th century. Brown groups the temple along with Anant Vasudev Temple and places it around the 11th–12th centuries. Another survey of Orissa temples carried out by S. K. Saraswati in 1953 yielded a similar date. Panigrahi, who did a comprehensive analysis of Orissan temples, gives an unspecified date between Lingaraj Temple and Mukteswara Temple. Fergusson believes construction of the temple was begun by around 1105. George Michell believes the temple was built during the same time as Lingaraja Temple. Rajarani Temple roughly belongs to the same period as the Jagannath Temple at Puri. The architecture of other temples in central India originated from this temple. The notable ones in the category are the Khajuraho temples and Totesvara Mahadeo temple in Kadawa. Scholars believe based on the style that the temple might have been built by Somavamsi kings who migrated from Central india to Orissa during the period. Rajarani temple is maintained by the Archaeological Survey of India (ASI) as a ticketed monument.

Architecture

The Orissan temples have two parts namely the sanctum (deul or vimana) and the other is the place from where pilgrims view the sanctum (called jagamohana). The initial deul temples were without the jagamohana as seen in some of the older temples in Bhubaneswar while the later temples had two additional structures namely nata-mandapa (festival hall) and bhoga-mandapa (hall of offerings). The vimana is square in plan, and the walls are variegated by ressaults (called rathas or pagas). Amalaka (also called mastaka), a stone disk with ridges on the rim, is placed over the bada (tower) of the temple. Rajarani Temple stands on a raised platform. The temple was constructed of dull red and yellow sandstone locally called "Rajarani".

Vimana
It is pancharatha in plan with a curvilinear superstructure (rekha shikhara) 18m(55 ft) tall. The vimana (tower) is surrounded by a cluster of miniature towers with double crowning elements and appears round, unlike other temples in Bhubaneswar but like the towers of Khajuraho temples. The temple stands on a plinth with three mouldings. The bada consists of five divisions instead of the three divisions usually found in other temples. The vimana (sanctum) measures * from the inside, * from the outside. Its spire is decorated with clusters of turrets (replication of the spire itself) emerging from the rib of the spire. The temple has panchanga bada, or five divisions, namely, pabhaga, talajangha, bandhana, uparajangha and baranda. The lowermost division, called the pabhaga, has five decorative mouldings, namely, khura, kumbha, patta, kani and basanta. The superstructure (gandi) of the temple has a number of miniature turrets (angashikharas). The superstructure is crowned with a fluted disc-shaped architectural piece called an amalaka, and a vase (kalasa) surmounts it as the crowning finial.

Jagamohana

The jagamohana (porch), though demonstrating a pyramidal structure, is yet to take on the status of a complete structure on its own. It bears signs of the repair done in 1903 when it collapsed into ruins. The jagamohana measures * from the inside and  * from the outside. The tiered (pidha) jagamohana and the interior are plain, possibly left incomplete. The plan of the jagamohana is square compared to the rectangular ones present in earlier temples.

Sculptures

The sculptures have a depth that was lacking in the Mukteswara Temple sculptures. The slightly projecting entrance is flanked by round thick columns entwined by naga on the left. Guardians of the eight directions project from the base of the temple in the eight directions, starting from the gateway in a clockwise direction around the porch and the deul, ending at the torana (entrance). The other noted sculptures are naga-nagi sthambha, saiva dwarapalas on the entrance doorjambs, and lakulisa on the lintel of entrance, above which is the architrave of Navagrahas. The best-preserved sculptures of the temple are the standing astadikpalas on the central façade of kanika, appearing on the jangha portion of the bada clad in diaphanous drapery. The image of Varuna is intact and notable for its body ornamentation, coiffure and facial expression. Scenes of the marriage of Shiva, Nataraja, and Parvati are the cult images present in the temple. There are tall, slender, sophisticated nayikas gracing the walls of the sanctum depicted in various roles and moods in amorous dalliance with actions such as turning their head from an emaciated ascetic, fondling her child, holding a branch of tree, attending to her toilet, looking into mirror, taking off her anklet, caressing her pet bird and playing instrument. There are also erotic (mithuna) figures carved in high relief on the projecting portions of the uparajangha. The other decorative motifs are carved in the shape of vyala, jagrata and gajakranta. The scroll motifs are of foliage, creepers and vines (vanalata), each containing lush foliage independent of any stalk or vine. It is a Hindu temple

Religious significance

The historian M. M. Ganguly examined the Khuraprista (upper plinth), which is carved like a lotus with its petals, and described the temple as possibly dedicated to Vishnu. The names of most Shiva temples in Bhubaneswar end with "Iswara" like Parasurameswara, Brahmesvara and Mitresvara. But Rajarani Temple bears a peculiar name and contains no images of any deity inside the sanctum. There are certain features of the temple which indicates a Saivite origin such as the presence of Saiva doorkeepers: Prachanda and Chanda, Dvarapla with jatamukha, and a garland of skulls reaching up to and a snake. K. C. Panigrahi believes that, based on the Ekamra Purana, the temple was originally called Indrevara and that it was positioned to the east of Siddheswara Temple. The image of Lakulisha, the founder of the Pasupatha sect of Saivisim, in a seated posture with yogamuthra along with his disciples, is found in the lintel of the jagamohana. Images of eight bearded ascetics are arranged on both sides of the images of Lakulisha. There are three panels on the facade of the main temple showing images of Shiva dancing with his consort Parvathi in the company of attendants playing musical instruments. A carving depicting the marriage of Shiva and Parvathi is on the western side below the central niche. The presence of Naga and Nagini at the entrance led to a local belief that it is the king (Raja) and queen (Rani) who are associated with the temple, leading to the name Rajarani, but this belief is not accepted by historians.

Festivals
The Department of Tourism of the Government of Odisha organises a Rajarani music festival at the temple every year from 18 to 20 January. The temple focuses on classical music, and all three styles of classical music – Hindustani, Carnatic and Odissi – are given equal importance. Musicians from different parts of the country perform during the three-day festival. The festival was started in 2003 with the help of the Bhubaneswar Music Circle (BMC).

See also
 List of temples in Bhubaneswar

In popular culture 

 In Killer in Kailash, Satyajit Ray's novel in The Adventures of Feluda series

Notes

References

External

https://www.lingaraj-temple.com/rajarani-temple/

Shiva temples in Odisha
Hindu temples in Bhubaneswar
Archaeological monuments in Odisha